Vincent Arcilesi (1932-2022) was an Italian-American  Contemporary artist and a prolific painter of landscapes and, more recently, cityscapes. His work has been shown internationally at prominent museums and galleries throughout the mid-20th and early 21st centuries. He has also been featured in various notable publications such as Art in America, The New York Times, Huffington Post, Gallery & Studio Magazine, and American Artist.  His work resides in museum collections, including The Hirshorn Museum, The Art Institute of Chicago, The Chicago Museum of Contemporary Art, Krannert Art Museum, and the Illinois State Museum. An expert artist of many mediums from large-scale murals to small drawings and lithographs, Arcilesi’s style shifted cyclically throughout his life from European Classicism, Abstract Expressionism, Avant-Garde, Impressionism, Post-Impressionism, and Italian Renaissance.

Education and Life 

Arcilesi attended Furman University in Greenville, SC. After receiving a BFA in Design at the University of Oklahoma, he eventually moved to Chicago to achieve a BFA and MFA in drawing and painting at the School of the Art Institute of Chicago, where he was trained as an abstract painter, and where he also met his wife, Nan Chapin Arcilesi.

Since his school days at the Art Institute of Chicago, Arcilesi was an independent artist who was one of the few students less interested in jumping on the “Hairy Who” bandwagon than in immersing himself in the school’s collection of Impressionist and Post-Impressionist masterpieces.

Much of Arcilesi's work revolves around a deep admiration for the human body set against either simplistic, domestic scenes or prominent, thematic locales worldwide. Although the eye is more immediately drawn to the Italian Renaissance striking nude posing in the streets and plazas of the world's great cities, Arcilesi often reproduced landscapes in his exhibition catalogs as an essential part of his oeuvre.

Later in his career, Arcilesi began directing much of his energy toward painting representational landscapes seen in his travels abroad. As a result, Arcilesi held many exhibitions showing this work at The Broome Street Gallery through the late 90s and early 2000s. These exhibitions consisted of his works created in a particular place in the world,  always entitled "Arcilesi in" with their respective country, which included Morocco, Rome, Russia, and Mexico.

Arcilesi was heavily involved with the New York Artists Equity Association (NYAEA) from the 90s throughout the rest of his life, as well as a recurring featured artist at galleries such as the Blue Mountain Gallery, 2/20 Gallery (now closed), and The Broome Street Gallery (now closed). Arcilesi was a full professor at the Fashion Institute of Technology (FIT) from the 90s to his retirement in 2015 where he taught life drawing and painting and participated in several faculty exhibitions and art shows held at FIT. During his time at FIT, Arcilesi participated in notable panels and speaker sessions where he discussed his artwork in line with the subject at hand. One example of this is his session, “Sex and the City: Lovers in Rome, New York, and Paris,” at the 1999 FIT Seminar “Healthy Sexuality in the 21st Century.”

Selected Drawings and Paintings 
A selection of Arcilesi's drawings & paintings can be found on Issuu.

Notable Exhibitions 

 America 1976 BiCentennial Sponsored by United States Department of the Interior
 Dates: March 11, 1978 through May 21, 1978
 Included Arcilesi works: 
 Grand Canyon, oil on canvas, 48 x 60"
 View from Point Imperial, oil on canvas, 48 x 60"
 Angels Landing, oil on canvas, 36 x 40"
 Shown at: 
 The Corcoran Gallery of Art
 The Wadsworth Atheneum
 The Fogg Art Museum
 Institute of Contemporary Art
 The Minneapolis Institute of Arts
 The Milwaukee Art Center
 The Fort Worth Art Museum
 The San Francisco Museum of Modern Art
 The High Museum of Art
 The Brooklyn Museum

Publications & Reviews 
 Huff Post, October 2017: Vincent Arcilesi Retrospective Profiles a Stylistic Virtuoso
 Gallery & Studio Magazine, September / October 2010 Edition: Arcilesi's New Roman Idyll by Ed McCormack
 The Villager, March 1995: Cand Greek Mythology, Celia Bergoffen,
 Arcilesi and the Immediacy of Myth, 1991 by Ed McCormack
 Artists of the Ideal by Edward Lucie-Smith
 Arts Magazine, May 1977, Vol. 51, No. 9: Hedy O'Beil review on Arcilesi's oil painting
 ArtSpeak, February 1985, Vol. 4, No. 2: Palmer Poroner reviews Arcilesi's work through a romanticist lens

Awards 

 1982 Arts Visual Artists Fellowship Grant

Works held in permanent collections 
 The Hirshhorn
 The Art Institute of Chicago
 Museum of Contemporary Art
 Krannert Art Museum

Personal life 
Arcilesi had two children with his wife Nan Chapin Arcilesi: Francesca Arcilesi, and Piero Arcilesi. Francesca Arcilesi is a Sales Associate at Jim Kempner Fine Art, and the co-owner of AHA Fine Art alongside Norma Homberg.

References 

1922 births
2022 deaths
Artists from St. Louis
Furman University alumni
University of Oklahoma alumni
School of the Art Institute of Chicago alumni
Fashion Institute of Technology faculty
American painters